Noel Abner Brown (March 21, 1926 - April 11, 2021) was an American tennis player in the mid-20th century. He was born in Stamford, Texas.

Brown was captain of the University of California at Los Angeles tennis team in 1946. 

He won singles titles at two of the world's oldest and most prestigious tennis events: in 1952 at Cincinnati and in 1956 at Canada. The latter event was held on grass in Vancouver, where he defeated the top two Canadian players, Bob Bedard and Don  Fontana in the semifinal and final respectively. He also won the doubles title at Canada in 1956. 

Brown was ranked in the U.S. Top Ten three times: in 1952 (No. 9), 1953 (No. 9) and 1959 (No. 8).

References

Cincinnati Enquirer articles, 1952
Bud Collins' Modern Encyclopedia of Tennis, 1994

1926 births
2021 deaths
American male tennis players
People from Stamford, Texas
Tennis people from Texas
UCLA Bruins men's tennis players